In mathematics, specifically Homological algebra, a double complex is a generalization of a chain complex where instead of having a -grading, the objects in the bicomplex have a -grading. The most general definition of a double complex, or a bicomplex, is given with objects in an additive category . A bicomplex is a sequence of objects  with two differentials, the horizontal differentialand the vertical differentialwhich have the compatibility relationHence a double complex is a commutative diagram of the formwhere the rows and columns form chain complexes.

Some authors instead require that the squares anticommute. That is

This eases the definition of Total Complexes. By setting , we can switch between having commutativity and anticommutativity. If the commutative definition is used, this alternating sign will have to show up in the definition of Total Complexes.

Examples 
There are many natural examples of bicomplexes that come up in nature. In particular, for a Lie groupoid, there is a bicomplex associated to itpg 7-8 which can be used to construct its de-Rham complex.

Another common example of bicomplexes are in Hodge theory, where on an almost complex manifold  there's a bicomplex of differential forms  whose components are linear or anti-linear.

See also 

 Chain complex
Derived algebraic geometry

Additional applications 

 https://web.archive.org/web/20210708183754/http://www.dma.unifi.it/~vezzosi/papers/tou.pdf

Homological algebra
Additive categories